The Village of Voisins is an 1874 painting by Alfred Sisley, now in the Musée d'Orsay after being left to the French state in 1911 by count Isaac de Camondo. The village shown in the work now forms as district in the town of Louveciennes, where Sisley lived from 1870 to 1874.

References

Paintings in the collection of the Musée d'Orsay
Paintings by Alfred Sisley
1874 paintings